Francien van Tuinen is a Dutch jazz-singer. In 1998, she graduated from the Prince Claus Conservatoire in Groningen.

Discography
 1998: Tuindance (VIA Records)
 2002: Despina's Eye (Culture Records Benelux)
 2003: A Perfect Blue Day
 2005: Muzyka (BMCD)
 2009: Daytrippers (Red Sauce Records)

References

External links
Official Site
Performance of Fallin'

Dutch jazz singers
Living people
Year of birth missing (living people)